Darko Dukić (born 3 June 1962) is a Croatian boxer. He competed in the men's middleweight event at the 1988 Summer Olympics.

References

External links
 

1962 births
Living people
Croatian male boxers
Olympic boxers of Yugoslavia
Boxers at the 1988 Summer Olympics
Sportspeople from Split, Croatia
Middleweight boxers